Warangal Railway station (station code: WL) is located in Warangal city, Telangana state in southern India. The station and all trains are operated by Indian Railways' Secunderabad railway division, which is part of the South Central Railway Zone. The station is on the New Delhi–Chennai line that runs to Vijayawada, Allahabad and New Delhi. A neighboring railway station is Kazipet Junction. Warangal Station is part of the Visakhapatnam - Secunderabad Vande Bharat Express connecting Hyderabad to Visakhpatnam in 8 hours and 30 minutes

Facilities
As part of the Station Redevelopment Project, Indian Railways has upgraded the Warangal Railway station with many passenger-friendly facilities. The eastern side of the railway station resembles Kakatiya architecture.  The general waiting hall, ladies' waiting hall, as well as the upper-class waiting hall present on the east side of the station have been modernized and widened as part of the redevelopment project.

Renovations 
Renovation on the western side of the station is still in progress. There is provision for a spacious concourse, one general waiting hall, one upper-class waiting hall, and one 'pay and use' toilet. Other facilities are also being planned. Provision is being made for disabled (Divyang) passengers in the form of separate toilets, ramps at entrances, etc. The circulation area on the western side of the station is being widened and provided with a separate entry and exit. The additional area will have the capacity to park 100 two-wheelers and 24 four-wheelers. This facility will ensure quick drop-offs and pickups for travelers using vehicles.

Walls in the concourse area and on platform No. 1 were decorated with local art, such as Cheriyal paintings. Stone flooring on platform No. 1 was replaced with granite flooring. Additionally, the seating capacity on the platform was expanded. Air condition and modern furniture were added to one of two waiting rooms. A second deluxe retiring room has been kept spacious for the comfort of passengers.

The boarding facility was extended to platform 4.  The bays increased from four to sixteen including a new cover. New rainwater harvesting pits tap rainwater for water conservation. Trees were planted in the available space. Windows were equipped with sun reflective glasses, which reduce direct sun exposure in the rooms and prevent overheating. Also, all platforms have been equipped with new LED signage boards and all light fixtures were equipped with LEDs to minimize energy consumption.

See also 
South Central Railway
Secunderabad railway division

References

External links 
https://warangalurban.telangana.gov.in/

Railway stations in Hanamkonda district
Transport in Warangal
Secunderabad railway division